Helen McGregor may refer to:

 Helen McGregor (writer), writer, actor and lecturer (1974-2021)
 Helen McGregor (geologist) (1974) Australian geologist and climate change researcher